Máel Ísu I is the third alleged Bishop of Cennrígmonaid (fl. mid-10th century), equivalent to latter day St Andrews. He is mentioned in the bishop-lists of the 15th-century historians Walter Bower (Malisius) and Andrew of Wyntoun (Malice) as the successor of Fothad I, and it is claimed that he reigned as bishop for eight years. If Máel Ísu's predecessor did get expelled from the bishopric in 955, (and Máel Ísu succeeded immediately), and if Máel Ísu's reign really was eight years, then Máel Ísu would have held the bishopric between the years 955 and 963.

Our only sources for Máel Ísu list his name in the forms Malisius and Malice, forms clearly identifiable with the common medieval Scottish name Máel Ísu ("tonsured one of Jesus"), and thus he cannot be identified with the "Bishop Máel Brigte" mentioned in the early 11th-century source known as the Chronicle of the Kings of Alba, whose death can be placed sometime between 966 and 971.

According to the lists, Máel Ísu was succeeded by Bishop Cellach II.

See also
 Máel Brigte

Notes

References
Anderson, Alan Orr, Early Sources of Scottish History: AD 500–1286, 2 Vols, (Edinburgh, 1922), vol. i
MacQueen, John, MacQueen, Winifred & Watt, D.E.R. (eds.), Scottichronicon by Walter Bower in Latin and English, Vol. 3, (Aberdeen, 1995)

External links

10th-century births
960s deaths
Bishops of St Andrews
Medieval Gaels from Scotland
10th-century Scottish bishops